Chahar Gonbad Rural District is a rural district (dehestan) in the Central District of Sirjan County, Kerman Province, Iran. At the 2006 census, its population was 2,564, in 655 families. The rural district has 81 villages.

It also contains many copper and metal mines: one metal mine is located near Bolboli village and the biggest copper mine is located near Takht. The name of the mine company is Takhtgonbad Copper Mine and it is located 80 km from Sirjan.

References 

Rural Districts of Kerman Province
Sirjan County